Johnny Bjerregaard (born 19 January 1943) is a Danish retired footballer and coach.

References

External links
 Rapid Archiv
 Sturm Archiv

1943 births
Living people
Danish men's footballers
Association football forwards
Aarhus Gymnastikforening players
SK Rapid Wien players
Aarhus Gymnastikforening managers
Footballers from Aarhus
Danish football managers
Danish expatriate sportspeople in Austria
Danish expatriate footballers
Expatriate footballers in Austria